A malasada (from "mal-assada" = "badly-baked"; similar to filhós), sometimes called "Portuguese fried dough," is a Portuguese confection. It is a fried type of doughnut, made of flattened rounds of yeast dough, flavoured with lemon zest and coated with granulated sugar and cinnamon. The traditional Portuguese malasadas do not contain holes or any type of filling, but some variations do, especially the ones made in Hawaii. Some cream fillings include coconut, passion fruit, guava, pineapple and custard. Malasadas are often eaten on Mardi Gras - the day before Ash Wednesday. Its origin can be traced back to the German Berliners. In Portugal, Berliners are slightly bigger than their German counterparts. They are also known as bolas de Berlim (lit. Berlin ball), and the filling is frequently an egg-yolk-based yellow cream called creme pasteleiro (lit. confectioner's cream). The filling is inserted after a half-length cut and is always visible. Regular sugar is used to sprinkle it. They can be found in almost every pastry shop in the country.

In Madeira, malasadas are mainly eaten on Terça-feira Gorda ("Fat Tuesday" in English; Mardi Gras in French) which is also the day before Lent begins. It is a traditional confection eaten in the Azores islands and in Madeira during the Portuguese Carnival (Carnival of Madeira in the Madeira Islands). Malasadas were created with the intention of using all the lard and sugar in one's home, in preparation for Lent (similar to the tradition of the Shrove Tuesday in the United Kingdom, commonly incorrectly called Pancake Day). This tradition was taken to Hawaii, where they celebrate Shrove Tuesday, known as Malasada Day, which dates back to the days of the sugarcane plantations of the 19th century when the Portuguese (mostly from Madeira and the Azores) went to Hawaii to work in those plantations, bringing their Catholic traditions. These workers used up butter and sugar prior to Lent by making large batches of malasadas. In some of the Portuguese islands, such as S. Miguel, Malasadas can also be eaten after dipping them in molasses. Malasadas are known by other names (for example, Filhoses and Farturas) depending on the region and island.

By region

Pacific Islands

In 1878, Portuguese laborers from Madeira and the Azores went to Hawaii to work in the plantations. These immigrants brought their traditional foods with them, including a fried dough pastry called "malasada." Today, there are numerous bakeries in the Hawaiian islands specializing in malasadas.

Mardi Gras ("Fat Tuesday"), the day before Lent, is Malasada Day in Hawaii. Being predominantly Catholic, Portuguese immigrants would need to use up all their butter and sugar prior to Lent. They did so by making large batches of malasadas, which they would subsequently share with friends from all the other ethnic groups in the plantation camps.

North America
In the United States, malasadas are cooked in many Portuguese or Portuguese descendant homes on Fat Tuesday. It is a tradition where the older children take the warm doughnuts and roll them in sugar while the eldest woman – mother or grandmother – cooks them.

On the East Coast, in Rhode Island and Southeastern Massachusetts, there is a high population of Portuguese-Americans. Festivals in cities such as New Bedford and Fall River will often serve Portuguese cuisine, including malasadas.

In media
Malasadas were a purchasable food item in the video game Pokémon Sun and Moon, and one of the main characters, Hau, is obsessed with them.

See also

 List of doughnut varieties
 Carnival of Madeira
 Cuisine of Hawaii
 Filhós
 Leonard's Bakery – A Portuguese bakery in Hawaii that popularized the malasada in Hawaii
 Portuguese Cuisine

References

(2010) Patrick Andrews - "Pioneering the Malasada" Queensland, Australia. 2010

External links

 Malasadas recipe (traditional stretched variety)
 Malasadas recipe (Emeril Lagasse's square version)

Doughnuts
Hawaiian cuisine
Madeiran cuisine
Portuguese cuisine
Portuguese desserts
Hawaiian desserts
Carnival foods